A list of Royal Flying Corps squadrons with date and location of foundation.

The Royal Flying Corps (RFC) was the aviation arm of the British Army. Squadrons were the main form of flying unit from its foundation on 13 April 1912, until its merging with the Royal Naval Air Service (RNAS) to form the Royal Air Force on 1 April 1918.

In June 1914, the RFC consisted of five aircraft squadrons; No. 2, 3, 4, 5 and 6. No. 1 Squadron was in the process of converting from balloons, while No. 7 was still being formed. On the outbreak of the First World War on 4 August 1914, the Military Wing of the RFC comprised 147 officers and 1,097 men with 179 aircraft. During the war the RFC underwent a rapid expansion, and by the end of 1916 had 46,000 personnel, and 2,712 aircraft in 64 operational and 33 reserve squadrons. A year later there were 10,938 aircraft in 115 operational and 109 training squadrons.

Squadrons

Reserve/Training Squadrons
Originally named Reserve Aeroplane Squadrons when formed, these were renamed to Reserve Squadrons on 13 January 1916, and then again to Training Squadrons on 31 May 1917 for the RFC or a little later for Royal Flying Corps Canada units.

NB: This number sequence was not linked to the operational squadrons; No. 1 Squadron RFC is not the same unit as No. 1 Training Squadron RFC.

Schools

See also
 List of Royal Air Force aircraft squadrons

References

Citations

Bibliography
 Castle, Ian. London 1914-17: The Zeppelin Menace. Osprey Publishing, 2008. 
 Cooksley, Peter G. The Royal Flying Corps Handbook, The History Press, England, 1 May 2013 
 Sturtivant. R, RAF Flying Training and Support Units since 1912, Air-Britain (Historians), England, 2007, 

Royal F